Lak Sao (Lakxao, Ban Lak Xao) is a small town in Khamkeut District, Bolikhamsai Province, of central Laos. It is located at the major crossroads where the 1E comes from the south, and the AH15, as Lao National Route 8, comes from the northeast and the border with Vietnam. The AH15 continues west to Thailand.

During the Vietnam War/Laotian Civil War the Laotian army fought the North Vietnamese at the Battle of Lak Sao.

Notes and references

Populated places in Bolikhamsai Province